The Silver Comet was a streamlined passenger train inaugurated on May 18, 1947, by the Seaboard Air Line Railroad (Seaboard Coast Line after merger with the Atlantic Coast Line on July 1, 1967).  Before its inaugural run, the new train was christened by actress Jean Parker at Pennsylvania Station in New York City. The train succeeded the SAL's Cotton States Special, which took the same route and which like the Silver Comet left the northeast at midday and arrived at Birmingham in the late morning.

Daily service extended from New York via Washington, D.C., Richmond, Virginia, Raleigh, North Carolina, and Atlanta, Georgia to Birmingham, Alabama.  From New York to Washington, the train was handled by the Pennsylvania Railroad; from Washington to Richmond, by the Richmond, Fredericksburg and Potomac Railroad; and by Seaboard from Richmond to points south. Under its original schedule, the New York–Birmingham trip took 23 hours at an average speed of 48 miles per hour.

The consist of the Silver Comet included baggage cars, coaches, Pullman sleepers, and a dining car between New York and Birmingham, along with through coaches and Pullmans to or from Portsmouth, Virginia, connecting at Raleigh, North Carolina.  A 48-seat observation car brought up the rear of the train.

Owing to declining passenger and mail revenues, the Silver Comet was discontinued in stages in 1969: the last trip between Atlanta and Birmingham was made on January 18; between Washington and Richmond, May 7; and between Richmond and Atlanta, October 14.  It lost its section that ran from Portsmouth's Seaboard Terminal in early 1968.  The last through sleeper had run on December 31, 1968.

Following abandonment of the Atlanta to Birmingham segment of the Silver Comet right-of-way by SAL-SCL successor CSX in 1989, portions were converted to the Silver Comet Trail in Georgia and the Chief Ladiga Trail in Alabama.

See also
 Crescent - now operated by Amtrak, which runs from New York to New Orleans via Washington, Atlanta, and Birmingham (a route partly parallel to that of the Silver Comet, but over ex-Southern rails)
 Silver Star - now operated by Amtrak, which runs from New York to Miami via Washington, Raleigh, Hamlet and Columbia (a route partly parallel to that of the Silver Comet, but over ex-Seaboard Air Line rails)

References

External links
Silver Comet timetable and consist as of May 1947
Seaboard ad announcing the new Silver Comet, 1947
Cobb County, Georgia, official site of the Silver Comet Trail
Links to information and maps about the Silver Comet Trail and Chief Ladiga Trail
Silver Comet Trail at Georgia's Railroad History and Heritage
Baer, Christopher T.  "Named Trains of the PRR Including Through Services," Pennsylvania Railroad Technical and Historical Society, 8 September 2009, accessed 28 May 2012 - includes details of commencement and discontinuance of service

Railway services introduced in 1947
Named passenger trains of the United States
Night trains of the United States
Passenger rail transportation in Alabama
Passenger rail transportation in Delaware
Passenger rail transportation in Georgia (U.S. state)
Passenger rail transportation in Maryland
Passenger rail transportation in New Jersey
Passenger rail transportation in New York (state)
Passenger rail transportation in North Carolina
Passenger rail transportation in South Carolina
Passenger rail transportation in Virginia
Passenger trains of the Seaboard Air Line Railroad
Passenger trains of the Seaboard Coast Line Railroad
Railway services discontinued in 1969